This is a list of filmmakers' signatures or Easter eggs that are found in many of their works which become signatures or trademarks. These are usually inconsequential small elements like signs which are inside jokes, cameos or references to other works. For this list, the term filmmakers is used loosely and would include directors, producers, actors, animators, and production companies.

 A113 is added by alumni of the California Institute of the Arts, referring to the classroom used by graphic design and character animation students.
 Acme Corporation is a fictional corporation featured in Looney Tunes' Road Runner/Wile E. Coyote cartoons with outlandish products that failed or backfired.
 CRM 114 was used by Stanley Kubrick, coming from the movie Dr. Strangelove.
 Hidden Mickey is a representation of Mickey Mouse that has been inserted subtly into Disney movies and other products.
 Alfred Hitchcock cameos became one of Hitchcock's signatures; and fans would make sport of trying to spot his cameos.
 Chuck Lorre used unique vanity cards on the end of every episode of his productions.
 Pixar includes several signatures such as A113, Luxo Jr.'s Luxo ball, Toy Story's Pizza Planet Truck, and "good luck charm" John Ratzenberger.
 Stan Lee cameos were a tradition in Marvel Comics films. 
 Steven Spielberg's shooting star started by accidentally capturing a meteor in Jaws.
 THX 1138 is used by George Lucas and Lucasfilm, and comes from Lucas' first movie THX 1138. Others have used just 1138, probably in reference to Lucas.
 A 1973 Oldsmobile Delta 88 appears in almost all of Sam Raimi's films.

See also

 List of directors who appear in their own films
 List of film and television directors
 Fictional brand

References

Further reading

External links
 Director and Producer Easter Eggs

In-jokes